The 1919–20 English football season was the 28th season in the Football League for Aston Villa, and the first following the end of World War I.

After a very public fall out with the Barnsley directors over travelling expenses, Frank Barson joined Aston Villa in October 1919. Barson joined Villa for a fee of £2,850 – "more than the average Sheffield worker earned in a year", according to a Sheffield newspaper – after persuasion from George Ramsay, who was rebuilding Villa after the First World War. In October 1919, he made his debut in a 4–1 win at Middlesbrough.
Barson played a large part in the Villa team during his three seasons at the club, but it is his run-ins with authority for which he is best known. 

Tommy Smart, played for Halesowen Town before signing for Aston Villa in January 1920 for a £300.00 fee.

Billy Walker made his senior debut in January 1920 in the FA Cup, scoring twice as Villa won 2-1 in the first round against non-league side Queens Park Rangers. He played in five more FA Cup games, scoring another three, helping Aston Villa reach the FA Cup Final. An extra time winner at Stamford Bridge by Billy Kirton saw Walker become an FA Cup winner in his debut season. Walker also scored 8 league goals in 15 matches at the back end of the 1919-20 season, including a hat-trick against Newcastle United, as Villa ended the first season after the first world war in ninth place.

Richard York scored one goal in 17 games in 1919–20, but did not feature in the 1920 FA Cup Final, which ended in a 1–0 victory over Huddersfield Town at Stamford Bridge.

Table

FA Cup

The 1920 FA Cup final, the first since the end of the First World War, was contested by Aston Villa and Huddersfield at Stamford Bridge. Aston Villa won 1–0, with the goal coming in extra time from Billy Kirton, to clinch the trophy for a record sixth time. This was the first ever FA Cup Final to require extra time to be played. Huddersfield had secured promotion from the Second Division this season and were appearing in their first final. 

Aston Villa captain, Andy Ducat, had represented England at both football and cricket. The Villa team had four surviving members of the club's last victory in the 1913 F.A. Cup final; Tommy Weston, Sam Hardy, Clem Stephenson and Charlie Wallace. Those four Villa players and Frank Moss had all served in the Armed Forces during World War I. Frank Barson, known for his tough style of play, was warned before the kick-off by the referee against using his normal tactics.

The trophy was presented by Prince Henry, the fourth son of King George V. This was Villa manager George Ramsay's sixth FA Cup Final win, a record for a manager, and one that was only equalled in 2015 by Arsène Wenger – against Aston Villa.

Road to the Final

Match details

References

External links
 FA Cup Final lineups
Aston Villa football club match record: 1920

Aston Villa F.C. seasons
FA Cup